Nine Girls is a 1944 American mystery film directed by Leigh Jason from a screenplay by Karen DeWolf and Connie Lee, based on the 1943 play of the same name by Wilfred H. Petitt. The film stars Ann Harding, Evelyn Keyes, Jinx Falkenburg, Anita Louise, Leslie Brooks, Lynn Merrick, Jeff Donnell, Nina Foch, Shirley Mills, and Marcia Mae Jones.

Police arrive at a cabin in the woods to investigate the murder of a snooty sorority sister on initiation night. It is raining too hard for anyone to leave, and panic sets in as the sorority sisters and their house mother begin to point fingers at one another.

Cast
 Ann Harding as Gracie Thornton
 Evelyn Keyes as Mary O'Ryan
 Jinx Falkenburg as Jane Peters
 Anita Louise as Paula Canfield
 Leslie Brooks as Roberta Halloway
 Lynn Merrick as Eve Sharon
 Jeff Donnell as "Butch" Hendricks
 Nina Foch as Alice Blake
 Shirley Mills as "Tennessee" Collingwood
 Marcia Mae Jones as Shirley Berke
 Willard Robertson as Capt. Brooks
 William Demarest as Walter Cummings
 Lester Matthews as Horace Canfield
 Grady Sutton as photographer

References

Bibliography

External links
 
 
 
 

1944 films
1944 mystery films
1940s American films
1940s English-language films
American black-and-white films
American films based on plays
American mystery films
Columbia Pictures films
Films about fraternities and sororities
Films directed by Leigh Jason
Films scored by John Leipold
Murder mystery films